Kiaabad (also Romanized as Kīāābād; also known as Keyābād, Kīābād, Kīāhābād, and Kiāhābād) is a village in Rahmatabad Rural District, Rahmatabad and Blukat District, Rudbar County, Gilan Province, Iran. At the 2006 census, its population was 176, in 54 families.

References 

Populated places in Rudbar County